Petri Lammassaari (born August 6, 1985) is a Finnish professional ice hockey forward. He is currently playing with Kopla of the 2. Divisioona. He previously played in the Finnish Liiga with Lukko, Espoo Blues, KalPa, Vaasan Sport and KooKoo.

Prior to the 2014–15 season, Jyrkkiö signed his first contract abroad in agreeing to a try-out contract with Austrian club, Graz 99ers in the EBEL on September 10, 2014. After just 11 games with the 99ers, Lammassaari opted to return to Finland, signing with Vaasan Sport on November 6, 2014.

Career statistics

References

External links

1985 births
Living people
Espoo Blues players
Finnish ice hockey right wingers
Graz 99ers players
Herning Blue Fox players
KalPa players
KooKoo players
Lukko players
SaPKo players
Starbulls Rosenheim players
Vaasan Sport players